Amphimallon lusitanicum is a species of beetle in the Melolonthinae subfamily that can be found in Portugal and Spain.

References

Beetles described in 1999
lusitanicum
Beetles of Europe